ConBravo! is an annual fan-run anime, gaming, and new media convention held during July in Hamilton, Ontario, Canada since 2010. The convention was created as a multi-genre event which has given it much of its framework, but has since begun to tout its specialization in the aforementioned areas.

It is notable for the special attention it has paid to online personalities, including the first Canadian speaking appearances of Doug Walker, Noah Antwiler, Angry Joe, Nathan Barnatt, and James Rolfe in 2011 and 2012. Further, its 2012 show was the first time Rolfe and Walker had appeared at a convention together, revisiting an online rivalry which saw a boom in popularity for the latter.

Gallery

See also
 List of comic book conventions
 List of anime conventions

References

External links
 Official Facebook

Multigenre conventions
Gaming conventions
Anime conventions in Canada
Events in Toronto
Summer events in Canada
2010 establishments in Ontario